Álsey or Álfsey  is an island in the Vestmann Islands, south of Iceland.

References

Vestmannaeyjar
Islands of Iceland